Portage is a ghost town and former settlement on Turnagain Arm in Alaska, about  southeast of Downtown Anchorage. All that remains today are the ruins of a few buildings and a "ghost forest" of trees that died after salt water inundated their root systems. Where there was once a town there is now only a railroad and road junction linking the Seward Highway and the Alaska Railroad to Portage Glacier park and the Anton Anderson Memorial Tunnel, which  leads to Whittier.

Popular recreational activities in the Portage area include visiting the wildlife center, floating Portage, Twentymile, Placer rivers, fishing for hooligan in the Twentymile river, and ice skating the numerous marshy areas, creeks, and Portage Lake.

Demographics

Portage first appeared on the 1950 United States Census as an unincorporated village. It returned again in 1960. It was destroyed in the 1964 earthquake and the townsite was annexed by Anchorage when it merged with its borough in 1975.

References

Ghost towns in Alaska
Neighborhoods in Anchorage, Alaska
Kenai Mountains-Turnagain Arm National Heritage Area
1964 disestablishments in Alaska
Ghost towns in the United States
Ghost towns in North America
Towns in the United States
Natural disaster ghost towns